A list of notable Turkish physicians:

A
Abdullah Cevdet Karlıdağ
Aziz Sancar
 Abdülaziz Efendi
 Abdülhak Adnan Adıvar
 Yıldırım Aktuna
 Ali Rıza Pasin
 Asaf Ataseven
 Asım Akin
 Ayhan Sökmen
 Ayşe Olcay Tiryaki

B
 Baha Akşit
 Bedrettin Yıldızeli

C
 Cemil Topuzlu
 Cüneyt Arkın

H
 Hulusi Behçet

M
 Mehmet Öz
 Murat Başkurt
 Mustafa Altıoklar

N
 Necati Çelim

P

 Pakize Tarzi

S
 Sabuncuoğlu Şerefeddin
 Safiye Ali

T
 Türkan Saylan